Drapetomania was a supposed mental illness that, in 1851, American physician Samuel A. Cartwright hypothesized as the cause of enslaved Africans fleeing captivity. This hypothesis centered around the belief that slavery was such an improvement upon the lives of slaves that only those suffering from some form of mental illness would wish to escape. 

Cartwright specifically cited the tendency of slaves to flee the plantations that held them. Since slaves happy with their condition would not want to leave, he inferred that such people had to be sick, impervious to the natural order of things. He published an article about black slaves' illnesses and idiosyncrasies in a widely circulated Southern journal. Contemporarily reprinted in the South, Cartwright's article was widely mocked and satirized in the northern United States. The concept has since been debunked as pseudoscience and shown to be part of the edifice of scientific racism.

The term derives from the Greek δραπέτης (drapetēs, "a runaway [slave]") and μανία (mania, "madness, frenzy").

As late as 1914, the third edition of Thomas Lathrop Stedman's Practical Medical Dictionary included an entry for drapetomania, defined as "Vagabondage, dromomania; an uncontrollable or insane impulsion to wander."

Description 

Cartwright described the disorder – which, he said, was "unknown to our medical authorities, although its diagnostic symptom, the absconding from service, is well known to our planters and overseers" – in a paper delivered before the Medical Association of Louisiana that was widely reprinted.

He stated that the malady was a consequence of masters who "made themselves too familiar with [slaves], treating them as equals".

In Diseases and Peculiarities of the Negro Race, Cartwright says that the Bible calls for a slave to be submissive to his master, and by doing so, the slave will have no desire to run away:

Prevention and remedy 

In addition to identifying drapetomania, his feeling was that with "proper medical advice, strictly followed, this troublesome practice that many Negroes have of running away can be almost entirely prevented".  In the case of slaves "sulky and dissatisfied without cause"—a warning sign of imminent flight—Cartwright mentioned "whipping the devil out of them" as a "preventative measure".

Contemporary criticism
While Cartwright's article was reprinted in the South, in the northern United States it was widely mocked. A satirical analysis of the article appeared in a Buffalo Medical Journal editorial in 1855. Renowned landscape architect Frederick Law Olmsted, in A Journey in the Seaboard Slave States (1856), observed that white indentured servants had often been known to flee as well, so he satirically hypothesized that the supposed disease was actually of white European origin, and had been introduced to Africa by traders.

See also
 Dysaesthesia aethiopica, another novel diagnosis of Cartwright's regarding what was seen as a mental illness that was the cause of laziness among slaves.
 The Protest Psychosis: How Schizophrenia Became a Black Disease
 Depression
 Dromomania
 Political abuse of psychiatry
 Fugitive slave
 Classification of mental disorders
 Sluggish schizophrenia

References

Sources
 Samuel A. Cartwright, "Report on the Diseases and Physical Peculiarities of the Negro Race", The New Orleans Medical and Surgical Journal 1851:691–715 (May).
 Reprinted in DeBow's Review XI (1851). Available at Google Books and excerpted at PBS.org.
 Reprinted in Arthur Caplan, H. Tristram Engelhardt, Jr., and James McCartney, eds, Concepts of Health and Disease in Medicine: Interdisciplinary Perspectives (Boston: Addison-Wesley, 1980).
 Reprinted in Arthur L. Caplan, James J. McCartney, Dominic A. Sisti, eds, Health, Disease, and Illness: Concepts in Medicine (Washington, D.C.: Georgetown University Press, 2004)

External links

 An Early History – African American Mental Health
 
 
DicoPolHiS

Bibliography 
Katherine Bankole, Slavery and Medicine: Enslavement and Medical Practices in Antebellum Louisiana, New York: Taylor and Francis Group, 1998.
Bob Myers, "Drapetomania": Rebellion, Defiance and Free Black Insanity in the Antebellum United States, phD thesis, 2014.

Scientific racism
Obsolete medical terms
Political abuses of psychiatry
Obsolete terms for mental disorders
Stereotypes of African Americans
White supremacy in the United States
Pseudoscience
Mania
Social problems in medicine
Slavery in the United States
Fugitive American slaves
Race and health in the United States
Psychiatric false diagnosis
History of psychology
Post-traumatic stress disorder